Lev Khasis (Лев Аронович Хасис) is a Russian and American manager, investor and entrepreneur. 
He was born 5 June 1966 in Kuybyshev, now Samara, RSFSR, USSR) 
He was the first CEO of the X5 Retail Group (2006–2011), Senior Vice-President and then CEO and President of New Formats at Walmart Stores Inc (2011-2013), Vice-Chairman of Jet.com (Jet.com Inc) until the company was acquired by Walmart at the end of 2016, Board member of Boxed.com from 2017 till 2021 etc.
Chairman of the board of Evotor.ru,DocDoc.ru and many other companies of the Sberbank Group in 2014-2021.

First deputy CEO of Sberbank since 2013 until February 15, 2022. He left Sberbank on 22 February 2022 due to the coming Russian Invasion of Ukraine and left Russia for the same reason.

Due to the Russian invasion of Ukraine in 2022, the United Kingdom imposed sanctions on Khasis.

Education 
In 1989 he graduated from Kuybyshev Aviation Institute (now University of Samara), the Aerospace engineering faculty.
In 1995 he graduated from banking faculty of the Moscow Financial Academy.

In May 1998 he received his PhD in AeroSpace Engineering from Samara University (ex Kuibyshev Aviation Institute) and in July 2006 he received his PhD in Economics from the Institute for System Analysis at the Russian Academy of Sciences.

Career

He served in various roles in business and the academy.

1989–1990 – Head of the Department of International Affairs of Kuybyshev Aviation Institute
1991–1993 – CEO of JSC "Samarsky Trading House"
1993–1994 – Samara branch general manager, vice-president of «Avtovazbank»
1995–1999 – president, chairman of the board of directors of OJSC «Aviacor» Corporation
1996–1998 – vice-president of OJSC «Alfa-Bank»
Since 1999 – member of the Board of Directors of ZAO Trading House «Supermarkets chain Perekrestok»
2001–2005 – Chairman of the Board of Directors of Trading House «TsUM» and Trading House «GUM (department store)»
2002 – 2006 – Chairman of the Board of Directors of Trading House «Supermarkets chain Perekrestok»
2006 – 2011 – Chief Executive Officer (CEO) of X5 Retail Group, the largest retail company in Russia
2007 – 2011 Chairman of the Association of Retailers of Russia (AKORT) 
2005 –  2014 member of the Board of Directors of "Transaero" Airlines
2011 – 2012 Senior Vice-President and Chief Leverage Officer at Wal-Mart Stores Inc 
2012–2013 CEO&President New Formats at Walmart Stores Inc
2015–2016 Vice-Chairman of Jet.com, Inc . 
2017-2021 Board member of Boxed.com until its IPO
2017-2020 Board Member of Kiavi.com (www.Kiavi.com) (ex LendingHome.com)
2017 - Co-Founder of Momentus.space (www.Momentus.space)
2017-2020 - Chairman of the Board of Momentus.space
September 2013 till February 2022 - First Deputy CEO at Sberbank

References

External links
 http://investing.businessweek.com/research/stocks/people/person.asp?personId=27274193&symbol=PJPq.L

Russian businesspeople in retailing
Russian bankers
People from Samara, Russia
1966 births
Living people
Echo of Moscow radio presenters
Financial University under the Government of the Russian Federation alumni
Russian activists against the 2022 Russian invasion of Ukraine
Samara State Aerospace University alumni